Daniel Atkins (November 18, 1866 – May 11, 1923) was a United States Navy sailor and a recipient of America's highest military decoration, the Medal of Honor.

Biography
Atkins was born on November 18, 1866, in Brunswick, Virginia. He enlisted in the U.S. Navy from the same state. For their conduct on this occasion, both Atkins and Everetts were recipients of the Medal of Honor. Atkins later obtained the rank of Chief Commissary Steward.

Atkins died on May 11, 1923, at Portsmouth, Virginia, and was buried in Captain Ted Conaway Memorial Naval Cemetery in the same city.

Medal of Honor citation
Rank and organization: Ship's Cook, First Class, U.S. Navy. Born: 1867, Brunswick, Va. Accredited to: Virginia. G.O. No.: 489, May 20, 1898.

Citation:

On board the U.S.S. Cushing, 11 February 1898. Showing gallant conduct, Atkins attempted to save the life of the late Ens. Joseph C. Breckenridge, U.S. Navy, who fell overboard at sea from that vessel on this date.

See also
List of Medal of Honor recipients
List of Medal of Honor recipients in non-combat incidents

References

1866 births
1923 deaths
United States Navy Medal of Honor recipients
People from Brunswick County, Virginia
United States Navy non-commissioned officers
Non-combat recipients of the Medal of Honor